
Wennington School, founded by the Quaker educationalist Kenneth C. Barnes, was a co-educational and ultimately progressive boarding school.

It was founded in 1940 in Lonsdale, Lancashire, England.  Early governors included Alfred Schweitzer and John Macmurray. During the Second World War the school was housed in Wennington Hall and after the war it relocated to Ingmanthorpe Hall near Wetherby, Yorkshire where it remained until its closure in 1975.

Headmasters included translator and poet Brian Merrikin Hill. The building was used in some episodes of the television series The Darling Buds of May.

Notable alumni
 William "Hammy" Howell – musician
 Peter Lawrence – developmental biologist
 Nicholas Maw – composer
 John Merrill – author and walker

Notes

References
Barnes, Kenneth C.; Involved Man: Action and Reflection in the Life of a Teacher
Barnes, Kenneth C.; Energy Unbound: Story of Wennington School

External links
"Wennington School", Wenningtonschool.com. Personal recollection web site, Autumn Leaves Bookshop, New Zealand
"Kenneth C. Barnes: personal papers", Planned Environment Therapy Trust

Defunct schools in Lancashire
Educational institutions established in 1940
Educational institutions disestablished in 1975
Schools in the City of Lancaster
Democratic free schools
Quaker schools in England
1940 establishments in England
1975 disestablishments in England